Mladen Ristić (Serbian Cyrillic: Младен Ристић; born 18 March 1982) is a Serbian football player.

References

External sources

Serbs star in Yangons afc.com

1982 births
Living people
Serbian footballers
FK Sloga Kraljevo players
Association football midfielders